Penstemon cinicola is a species of penstemon known by the common name ash penstemon. It is native to northeastern California and southern Oregon, where it grows in forests and plateau habitat. It is a perennial herb with upright branches  maximum height. The inflorescence produces tubular flowers with wide lipped mouths.

External links

cinicola
Flora of California
Flora of Oregon
Flora of the United States
Flora without expected TNC conservation status